was a town located in Aira District, Kagoshima Prefecture, Japan.

As of 2003, the town had an estimated population of 5,397 and the density of 76.61 persons per km². The total area was 70.45 km².

On November 7, 2005, Yokogawa, along with the city of Kokubu, the towns of Kirishima (former), Fukuyama, Hayato, Makizono and Mizobe (all from Aira District), was merged to create the city of Kirishima and no longer exists as an independent municipality.

References
 Japanese Wikipedia article about Yokogawa

External links
 Official website of Kirishima 

Dissolved municipalities of Kagoshima Prefecture